Assistant to the President and National Security Advisor to the Vice President role is to advise the Vice President on all matters of national security and provide input to the National Security Council and serves as the primary foreign policy and national security lead in the Office of the Vice President of the United States.

Currently, The National Security Advisor to Vice President Kamala Harris is Philip Gordon

Most recently others include Nancy McEldowney, Keith Kellogg, Colin Kahl, Jake Sullivan, and John P. Hannah.

References 

 
Political terminology